Ratu Udre Udre  (pronounced , ; died 1840) was a Fijian chief. He is listed by Guinness World Records as "most prolific cannibal" — during the early 19th century, he reportedly ate "between 872 and 999 people", although differing accounts give different totals of how many people he cannibalised (most say his murder count is only around 99). The total of 872 was based on "a row of smallish stones extending about 200 yards" near where Udre Udre lived, with each stone placed by Udre Udre to account for a person he had eaten.

Udre Udre is believed to have been shot and killed by Fiji government officials in 1840; however, the manner of his death is still undocumented.

His victims were "spoils of war"; every person that he killed and ate was in return of a war victory.

References

External links

Fijian chiefs
People from Rakiraki
Fijian cannibals
Oceanian rulers
1840 deaths